Microtis alba, commonly known as the white mignonette orchid or slender onion-orchid, is a species of orchid endemic to the south-west of Western Australia. It has a single hollow, onion-like leaf and up to sixty small, green and white flowers with a strong musky fragrance. It is much more common after a fire the previous summer than in unburned country.

Description 
Flowering occurs from October to January but much more prolifically after fire the previous summer.

Taxonomy and naming
Microtis alba was first formally described by Robert Brown in 1810 and the description was published in Prodromus Florae Novae Hollandiae et Insulae Van Diemen. The specific epithet (alba) is a Latin word meaning "white".

Distribution and habitat
The white mignonette orchid grows in a range of habitats from seasonally wet flats to forest and occurs between Dongara and Israelite Bay.

Conservation
Microtis alba is classified as "not threatened" by the Western Australian Government Department of Parks and Wildlife.

References

External links
 

alba
Endemic orchids of Australia
Orchids of Western Australia
Plants described in 1810